Qazakh City Stadium is a multi-use stadium in Qazakh, Azerbaijan.  It is currently used mostly for football matches and is the home stadium of Göyazan Qazakh FK. The stadium holds 15,000 people.

See also
List of football stadiums in Azerbaijan

References

Football venues in Azerbaijan